Lycianthes is a genus of plants from the nightshade family (Solanaceae), found in both the Old World and the New World, but predominantly in the latter. It contains roughly 150 species, mostly from tropical America, with 35-40 species in Asia and the Pacific.

Characteristics

Lycianthes is apparently closely related to the chili and bell peppers (Capsicum). However, it was long confused with the nightshades (Solanum), and several little-known Solanum species presumably belong here.

Species
Full species list in The Plant List

Species include:
 Lycianthes australis (C.V.Morton) Hunz. & Barboza
 Lycianthes biflora (Lour.) Bitter
 Lycianthes denticulata (Blume) Bitter
 Lycianthes hypochrysea
 Lycianthes laevis (Dunal) Bitter
 Lycianthes lycioides (L.) Hassl.
 Lycianthes mociniana (Dunal) Bitter – tlanochtle (Nahuatl)
 Lycianthes rantonnetii (Carrière) Bitter – blue potato bush
 Lycianthes rimbachii
 Lycianthes shanesii (F.Muell.) A.R.Bean
 "Solanum chrysophyllum"
 "Solanum lanuginosum"
 "Solanum mucronatum" – "pepino"

Related species
Other "Solanum" taxa of unknown identity but presumably belonging into Lycianthes include S. ciliatum Blume ex Miq., S. corniculatum Hiern, S. retrofractum var. acuminatum, S. violaceum Blume, S. violifolium f. typicum, S. virgatum notst β albiflorum, S. uniflorum Lag. and S. uniflorum var. berterianum.

See also
 Nonochton

References

External links

 
Solanaceae genera